Most regions and provinces of Europe have alternative names in different languages. Some regions have also undergone name changes for political or other reasons. This article attempts to give all known alternative names for all major European regions, provinces, and territories. It also includes some lesser regions that are important because of their location or history.

This article does not offer any opinion about what the "original", "official", "real", or "correct" name of any region is or was. Regions are (mostly) listed alphabetically by their current best-known name in English, which does not necessarily match the title of the corresponding article. The English version is followed by variants in other languages, in alphabetical order by name, and then by any historical variants and former names.

Foreign names that are the same as their English equivalents may be listed.

A

B

C

D

E

F

G

H

I

J

K

L

M

N

O

P

R

S

T

U

V

W

Z

See also
 Endonym and exonym
 List of alternative country names
 List of country names in various languages
 List of European rivers with alternative names
 List of European cities with alternative names
 List of Latin place names in Europe
 List of Asian regions with alternative names
 Latin names of regions
 List of places
 Polish historical regions

References

External links
Place names of Europe

wiktionary:de:Verzeichnis:Liste alternativer Städtenamen

Regions
Lists of place names